Michael Charles Bender is an American writer and reporter for The New York Times.

Born in Cleveland, Ohio, Bender was educated at Ohio State University, where he graduated with a degree in history in 2000.

Bender joined The Wall Street Journal in 2016. He was awarded the Gerald R. Ford Foundation Journalism Prize for Distinguished Reporting on the Presidency in 2019, and a National Press Club Award in 2020. In 2021, he published his first book, Frankly, We Did Win This Election. The book covers the events that led to President Donald Trump’s loss of the 2020 presidential election to Joe Biden. The book also featured on The New York Times best seller list.

He married journalist Ashley Parker, White House reporter for The Washington Post, in 2018.

Bibliography
 Bender, Michael C. (2021). Frankly, We Did Win This Election: The Inside Story of How Trump Lost

References

External links
Author page at The Wall Street Journal

21st-century American writers
Writers from Cleveland
Ohio State University alumni
The Wall Street Journal people
Living people
Year of birth missing (living people)